Saila Quicklund (born 31 October 1961) is a Swedish politician from the Moderate Party. She has been a member of the Riksdag from Jämtland County since 2010.

References

External links 
 Saila Quicklund at the Riksdag

Living people
1961 births
21st-century Swedish women politicians
Members of the Riksdag from the Moderate Party
Women members of the Riksdag
Members of the Riksdag 2010–2014
Members of the Riksdag 2014–2018
Members of the Riksdag 2018–2022
People from Jämtland County
Members of the Riksdag 2022–2026